Philippe Reinhart (26 December 1924 – 16 July 2016) was a French sailor. He competed in the Dragon event at the 1960 Summer Olympics.

References

External links
 

1924 births
2016 deaths
French male sailors (sport)
Olympic sailors of France
Sailors at the 1960 Summer Olympics – Dragon
People from Sainte-Adresse
Sportspeople from Seine-Maritime